Emma Mærsk is the first container ship in the  of eight owned by the A. P. Moller-Maersk Group. When launched in 2006, she was the largest container ship ever built, and in 2010 she and her seven sister ships were among the longest container ships.

History
Emma Mærsk was built at the Odense Steel Shipyard in Denmark. In June 2006, during construction, welding work caused a fire within the superstructure. It spread rapidly through the accommodation section and bridge, which delayed her completion by six to seven weeks.

She was named in a ceremony on 12 August 2006, after Mærsk Mc-Kinney Møller's late wife, Emma. On 16 August 2006, five tugboats dragged Emma Maersk from her Danish shipyard and towed her backward to the sea. She set sail on her maiden voyage on 8 September 2006 at 02:00 hours from Aarhus, calling at Gothenburg, Bremerhaven, Rotterdam, Algeciras, the Suez Canal, and arrived in Singapore on 1 October 2006 at 20:05 hours. She sailed the next day for Yantian in Shenzhen, then Kobe, Nagoya, arriving at Yokohama on 10 October 2006, and returning via Shenzhen, Hong Kong, Tanjung Pelepas, the Suez Canal, Felixstowe, Rotterdam, Bremerhaven, Gothenburg to Aarhus, arriving on 11 November 2006 at 16:00 hours.

In 2008, the ship was featured on an episode of the television documentary series Mighty Ships, during a voyage between Malaysia and Spain.

In 2011, the National Bank of Denmark issued a 20 DKK commemorative coin for her.

Going eastwards on 1 February 2013, she suffered a damaged stern thruster and took on so much water in the Suez Canal that she became unmaneuverable. Tugs, anchors and the wind took her to Port Said to offload 13,500 containers, drain her and be investigated by divers. She had not been in danger of sinking.

On 15 February 2013, the Maersk Line confirmed that she was about to leave Port Said under tow to a yard for further assessment and repair. On 25 February she reached the yard of Palermo, Sicily, where she was scheduled to stay for four months. The flooded engine was disassembled, repaired and assembled, and in August 2013, she was in service again after a DKK 250 million (roughly US$44.5m) repair.

Capacity
Originally Maersk reported a capacity of 11,000 TEU (twenty-foot equivalent units) as the maximum capacity of fully loaded 14 ton containers, according to Maersk company's then method of calculating capacity, which, at her introduction into service, was about 1,400 more containers than any other ship. However, Maersk also acknowledges the standard method of defining capacity, stating 14,770 TEU.

By normal calculations, she has a capacity significantly greater than reported—between 13,500 and 15,200 TEU. The difference between the official and estimated numbers is because Maersk calculates the capacity of a container ship by weight (in this case, 14 tons/container), i.e. 11,000+ containers, of which 1,000 can be refrigerated containers.

Other companies calculate capacity according to the maximum number of containers that can be carried irrespective of weight, always greater than the number calculated by the Maersk method.  As of 2012, the E class is still the largest by full-weight 14-tonne capacity.  can carry 10,000 14 t containers, 16,020 if not fully loaded.

A further ten ships were ordered in June 2011. The first was delivered in 2013.

Engine and hull
She is powered by a Wärtsilä-Sulzer 14RTFLEX96-C engine, the world's largest single diesel unit, weighing 2,300 tonnes and capable of  when burning  of heavy fuel oil per hour.

At economical speed, fuel consumption is 0.260 bs/hp·hour (1,660 gal/hour). She has features to lower environmental damage, including exhaust heat recovery and cogeneration. Some of the exhaust gases are returned to the engine to improve economy and lower emissions, and some are passed through a steam generator which then powers a Peter Brotherhood steam turbine and electrical generators. This creates an electrical output of 8.5 MW, equivalent to about 12% of the main engine power output. Some of this steam is used directly as shipboard heat. Five diesel generators together produce 20.8 MW, giving a total electric output of 29 MW. Two 9 MW electric motors augment the power on the 150 meter main propeller shaft, the longest in the world.

Two bow and two stern thrusters provide port manoeuvrability, and two pairs of stabilizer fins reduce rolling. A special silicone-based paint, instead of biocides used by much of the industry, keeps barnacles off of the hull. This increases her efficiency by reducing drag while also protecting the ocean from biocides that may leak. The paint is credited with lowering the water drag enough to save 1,200 tonnes of fuel per year. The ship has a bulbous bow, a standard feature for cargo ships.

The engine is near midship to make best use of the rigidity of the hull and to maximize capacity. When the ship rolls 20 degrees, the bridge sways 35 metres.

The ships anchors weigh 29 tons each and each chain-link weighs 200 Kg.

Sailing schedules
Her regular round trip is between northern Europe and the far east via the English Channel, the Strait of Gibraltar and the Suez Canal, calling at Ningbo, Xiamen, Hong Kong (westbound), Yantian (westbound), Algeciras (westbound), Rotterdam, Bremerhaven, Algeciras (eastbound), Yantian (eastbound), Hong Kong (eastbound), and Ningbo.

, the schedule included Gdańsk, Aarhus, and Gothenburg.

References

External links

 Description and technical details for ship engine, with photos, at official website for Emma Maersk ship.
 World’s Largest Diesel Engine- Emma Maersk’s Wärtsilä-Sulzer RTA96-C, 26 February 2019.
 The World's Most Gargantuan Diesel Engine, by Andrew Tarantola, 20 July 2011. 
 This is what 109,000 horsepower looks like – meet the biggest and most powerful engine in the world.This jaw dropper is the Wärtsilä RT-flex96C, the world’s largest and most powerful diesel engine in the world today. by Tibi Puiu. 16 May 2019. zmescience.com
 The Engines of the Largest Container Ships in the World, and Challenges their Manufacturers Face, 28 May 2018. 
 Exclusive Photos: Inside the Engine Room Of Maersk Triple- E, By MI News Network | In: Photo of the day |  Updated on 1 January 2020.

Merchant ships of Denmark
Container ships
Ships of the Maersk Line
Ships built in Odense
2006 ships
Maritime incidents in 2006
Ship fires